Jack William Wilson (November 20, 1917 – April 11, 2001) was an American football halfback who played two season for the Los Angeles Rams of the National Football League. Wilson was selected in the first round (2nd pick overall) by the Cleveland Rams in the 1942 NFL Draft.

References

External links
 NFL.com player page
 

1917 births
2001 deaths
American football halfbacks
Baylor Bears football players
Los Angeles Rams players
People from Paris, Texas
Players of American football from Texas